Ćavar is a Croatian surname. The surname has etymological origin in the Venetian word ciavarro, meaning a one-year-old ram. Notable people with the surname include:

 Ivona Ćavar (born 1995), Bosnian-Herzegovinian karate competitor
 Josip Cavar (born 1993), Swedish handball player
 Marijan Ćavar (born 1998), Bosnian-Herzegovinian footballer
 Marin Cavar (born 1999), Swiss footballer
 Patrik Ćavar (born 1971), Croatian handball player

See also 

 Ciavarro, Italian surname
 Šiljeg, a Croatian surname of similar etymological meaning

Footnotes

Bibliography

Journals 

 

Croatian surnames
Slavic-language surnames
Surnames of Italian origin